Torr Mor is a hill peak landform on the coastal east side of the Kintyre Peninsula in Scotland. The peak offers views over the Kilbrannan Sound.
The Forestry Commission maintain a footpath over the hill.

See also
 Kildonald Bay

Line notes

References
 Sir Archibald Geikie, Benjamin Nieve Peach, Alfred Harker. 1903. The geology of North Arran, South Bute, and the Cumbraes, 200 pages

Mountains and hills of Argyll and Bute
Kintyre